Charles Pépin is a French philosopher and novelist. He was born in Saint Cloud in 1973. He is the author of several bestsellers, such as Les Vertus de l’échec (Allary Éditions, 2016), La Confiance en soi (Allary Éditions, 2018) and La Planète des sages (Dargaud, 2011 et 2015).

Books

Essays 
Une semaine de philosophie, Flammarion, 2006  / J'ai Lu, 2008 
Les Philosophes sur le divan - Quand Freud rencontre Platon, Kant et Sartre, Flammarion, 2008  / J'ai Lu, 2010 
Qu'est-ce qu'avoir du pouvoir ?, Desclée de Brouwer, 2010 
Ceci n'est pas un manuel de philosophie, Flammarion, 2010 
Un homme libre peut-il croire en Dieu, Éditions de l'opportun, 2012 
Quand la Beauté nous sauve, Robert Laffont, 2013, Marabout 2014 
Les Vertus de l'échec, Allary Éditions, 2016 
La Confiance en soi, Allary Éditions, 2018 
La Rencontre, Allary Éditions, 2021

Novels 

 Descente, Flammarion, 1999 
 Les Infidèles, Flammarion, 2003 
 La Joie, Allary Éditions, 2015, Folio, 2016

Cartoons 
 La planète des sages, Tome 1 - Encyclopédie mondiale des philosophes et des philosophies, en collaboration avec Jul, Dargaud, 2011, 
 Platon La Gaffe - Survivre au travail avec les philosophes, avec Jul, Dargaud, 2013 
 La planète des sages, Tome 2 - Encyclopédie mondiale des philosophes et des philosophies, en collaboration avec Jul, Dargaud, 2015, 
 50 nuances de Grecs, Tome 1 - Encyclopédie des mythes et des mythologies, avec Jul, Dargaud, 2017 
50 nuances de Grecs, Tome 2 - Encyclopédie des mythes et des mythologies, avec Jul, Dargaud, 2019

References

21st-century French philosophers
Living people
1973 births